Lekoko is a department of Haut-Ogooué Province in south-eastern Gabon. The capital lies at Bakoumba. It had a population of 4,920 in 2013.

Towns and villages

References

Haut-Ogooué Province
Departments of Gabon